"Ocean Eyes" is the second single by American singer Billie Eilish and is part of her debut EP, Don't Smile at Me, and the soundtrack album to the film Everything, Everything (2017). The song was written and produced by Eilish's older brother, Finneas O'Connell, and was originally written for his band. Finneas gave the song to Eilish for her dance performance after realizing the song suited her vocals. It was originally released on SoundCloud on November 18, 2015, but was later re-released commercially on November 18, 2016, as a single through Darkroom and Interscope Records.

"Ocean Eyes" received mainly positive reviews from critics, several of whom praised its composition and the lyrical content. The song was commercially successful, reaching number 84 on the US Billboard Hot 100. It peaked within the top 60 in the record charts of several countries and peaked at number 72 on the UK Singles Chart. "Ocean Eyes" has received several certifications, including a triple-platinum certification by the Recording Industry Association of America (RIAA).

To promote the song, the track was accompanied by a music video, directed by Megan Thompson and released on March 24, 2016. A dance performance video was released on November 22, 2016. Eilish included the track on the setlists of her 2019 When We All Fall Asleep Tour, her 2020 Where Do We Go? World Tour, and her 2022 Happier Than Ever, The World Tour.

Background and release 
The track was written, mixed, and produced by Eilish's brother, Finneas O'Connell. Finneas had written and produced "Ocean Eyes" originally for his band, the Slightlys, before realizing it would be a better fit for Eilish's vocals. He gave it to Eilish when her dance teacher at the Revolution Dance Center (Honolulu Avenue, Los Angeles) Fred Diaz asked them to write a song for choreography. The track was entirely made using Logic stock sounds. The vocals were recorded with an Audio-Technica AT2020 microphone. In a 2017 interview with Teen Vogue, Eilish said: "[Finneas] came to me with 'Ocean Eyes,' which he had originally written for his band. He told me he thought it would sound really good in my voice. He taught me the song and we sang it together along to his guitar and I loved it. It was stuck in [my] head for weeks." Finneas would later become Eilish's manager.

Eilish and her brother uploaded the track to SoundCloud on November 18, 2015, so Diaz could have access to it. The song went viral overnight. When Eilish got a growth plate injury, it put an end to her dancing career and she turned her focus toward a recording career. After Eilish signed to Darkroom and Interscope Records, "Ocean Eyes" was re-released for digital download and streaming on November 18, 2016, as the lead single on Eilish's debut EP, Don't Smile at Me, and the soundtrack album to the film Everything, Everything (2017). Mastering was handled by studio personnel John Greenham. An EP featuring remixes by Astronomyy, Blackbear, Goldhouse and Cautious Clay was released on January 14, 2017. 

In 2023 Katy Perry revealed that she was sent an email by Unsub Records about "Ocean Eyes" with hopes of collaboration when it was to be released. But she thought it "was just a blonde girl" and "Meh, boring". In retrospect, however, she dubbed it was a "Big mistake. Huge mistake.".

Composition and lyrical interpretation

"Ocean Eyes" has a tempo of 145 beats per minute (BPM). The song is played in the key of E minor, while Eilish's vocals span a range of E3 to B5. Critical commentary described "Ocean Eyes" as a pop, dream-pop, synth-pop, indie-pop, and R&B ballad. Laurence Day of The Line of Best Fit described the song having "sparse percussion" and "low-slung bass". He further mentions Eilish's vocals "are soft and melodic, dispersing amongst the effervescent synths". Writing for i-D, Mathias Rosenzweig described the song as an "unhurried, minimalist beats and lush synths, reminiscent of ocean waves on a dreary grey day".

Mathias Rosenzweig of Vogue stated that Eilish compares "love to falling off a cliff" and that she is "surrounded by the warlike intensity of napalm skies" and further says it's "a profound description for a 14-year-old, and it's led to an enormous amount of interest in her debut song—as well as the singer herself. Rosenzweig mentions the song has "airy soprano vocals [that] also conjure up thoughts of the ocean washing over the song's mellow percussion and minimalist synths. The song's maturity paired with a few childish ideals—she sings, for example, that love is 'no fair'—struck a chord. Claudia Willen of Insider stated that lyrically, "Ocean Eyes" is about a "dreamy love letter to a crush with ocean eyes": "I've been watchin' you for sometime/Can't stop staring at those ocean eyes/Burning cities and napalm skies/Fifteen flares inside those ocean eyes/Your ocean eyes".

Critical response
Upon release, "Ocean Eyes" received critical acclaim from music critics. Timothy Monger of AllMusic called the track "lush" and "lonesome". Writing for Billboard, Jason Lipshutz described the track as "understated" and "heartbreaking". Rebecca Haithcoat of SSENSE labelled "Ocean Eyes" as "gauzy". Stephen Thompson of NPR cited the track as "moody". Nicole Almeida of Atwood Magazine commended the lyrical content, which she described as "vulnerable" and "atmospheric", and mentions "the layered vocals and Eilish's great voice make this song special". Adrien Begrand from PopMatters affirmed the song shows Eilish's "precocious talent". Mike Wass writing for Idolator labeled the song as a "dreamy ballad". 

NME ranked "Ocean Eyes" at number 11 on its "Every single Billie Eilish song ranked in order of greatness" list, with the staff saying the "most memorable moments on 'Ocean Eyes' are its most vulnerable, like the opening whispers or the sure-footed yet restrained chorus". Insider said "one could easily question if Eilish would be the household name she is now without the success of this stunning [song]". Dan Regan of Billboard praised Astronomyy's remix, saying "[Eilish's] voice echoes over a stripped down intro before a tinny beat kicks in with some new background vocals", while he cited Blackbear's remix brought the song "new emotional heights" and described it has "trapped ou with 808 tinges and even more ghostly with his added vocal harmonies".

Commercial performance
"Ocean Eyes" first peaked at number 11 on the Bubbling Under Hot 100 chart on November 11, 2018. Following the release of Eilish's debut studio album, When We All Fall Asleep, Where Do We Go? (2019), "Ocean Eyes" rose to number 84 on the US Billboard Hot 100 chart. At the same time, Eilish broke the record for the most simultaneous Hot 100 entries for a female artist. It has received a triple-platinum certification by the Recording Industry Association of America (RIAA), which denotes track-equivalent sales of three million units based on sales and streams. In the United Kingdom, the single peaked at number 72 on the UK Singles Chart, and has received a platinum certification from the British Phonographic Industry (BPI), which denotes track-equivalent sales of 600,000 units. It was also successful in Australia, peaking at number 58 on the ARIA Charts and being awarded a 7× platinum certification by the Australian Recording Industry Association (ARIA) in 2021.

Performances

A music video for "Ocean Eyes" directed by Megan Thompson was uploaded to Eilish's official YouTube channel on March 24, 2016.  The visual sees Eilish singing to the camera while a torrent of lilac smoke surrounds her. Chris Deville of Stereogum praised Thompson's directing, saying it "will certainly help" the song for the future. A dance performance video was also uploaded to Eilish's official YouTube channel on November 22, 2016. Rosenzweig described the dance visual as a "scaled-back, emotional choreography".

"Ocean Eyes" was performed live during Eilish's North American 1 by 1 tour in 2018. Eilish performed it at the Coachella Valley Music and Arts Festival in April 2019, at the Glastonbury Festival in June, and at Pukkelpop in August 2019. "Ocean Eyes" was included on the set list of Eilish's 2019 When We All Fall Asleep Tour. The track was also included on the setlist of her 2020 Where Do We Go? World Tour. Alicia Keys covered "Ocean Eyes" in December 2019 at Jungle City Studios in New York for Spotify's Singles series. Rania Aniftos of Billboard said Keys' cover gave "Ocean Eyes" a "characteristically soulful twist with a piano arrangement". In December of the same year, Eilish performed "Ocean Eyes" for The Late Late Show with James Corden, with Keys playing the piano in front of an all-women studio audience. The two singers would swap vocals. A demo of the song was made available on Logic Pro X in May 2020. During a 2022 world tour in support of her second studio album Happier Than Ever (2021), Eilish performed "Ocean Eyes" as part of a mashup of her first singles; "Bored" and "Bellyache" were the other singles in the mashup.

Track listing

Credits and personnel
Credits adapted from the liner notes of Don't Smile at Me.
 Billie Eilish – vocals
 Finneas O'Connell – producer, songwriter, mixer
 John Greenham – mastering engineer

Charts

Weekly charts

Year-end charts

Certifications

Release history

References

External links 
 
 

2016 debut singles
2015 songs
2010s ballads
Contemporary R&B ballads
Dream pop songs
Interscope Records singles
Billie Eilish songs
Songs written by Finneas O'Connell
Song recordings produced by Finneas O'Connell
Synth-pop ballads